Rogel Kyle Cariño Jr. (born September 3, 2002), popularly known as Bugoy Cariño, is a Filipino actor and dancer. He joined Star Circle Kid Quest, a television search for young talented kids in 2009, and emerged as the winner. Since then, he has appeared in numerous television shows, films, and endorsed several local brands in the Philippines.

Early life
Rogel Kyle Cariño Jr. was born on September 3, 2002, to a Roman Catholic family in Gen. Mariano Alvarez, Philippines.

At the age of 4, Cariño has expressed an interest in dancing. He has joined several dance contests in different barangays, and has been a member of a local hip hop dance crew, Higher Level. This has enabled him to appear in numerous commercials.

Career
In 2009, he joined the third season of ABS-CBN's Star Circle Quest which was hosted by Ai-Ai de las Alas and Ruffa Gutierrez. At the end of the competition, he was proclaimed as the winner of the said search.

After winning the child artist search, he became a regular cast of the award-winning children gag show, Goin' Bulilit. Since then, he has appeared in several shows in ABS-CBN. In 2012, he starred as the main protagonist in E-Boy. He is also a star magic talent of ABS-CBN's Star Magic.

Filmography

Television

Movies

Accolades

Awards and nominations

Personal life 
On September 3, 2020 (Bugoy's 18th birthday), his girlfriend Ennajie Laure posted on Instagram pictures of their female baby child Scarlet for the first time. Back in March 2018, Bugoy and EJ denied the pregnancy issue through their social media accounts when Bugoy was only 15 years old at the time and EJ was already 20.

References

External links
 

2002 births
Living people
Star Magic
Star Circle Quest participants
Star Circle Quest winners
Filipino male child actors
Filipino male film actors
Filipino male dancers
Male actors from Cavite
ABS-CBN personalities
Filipino male television actors